Operation Whistle is an investigation by the States of Jersey Police into allegations of historical sexual abuse of children in Jersey. In a press release by the States of Jersey Police, they have stated that it is being carried on under the auspices of Operation Hydrant. It is cooperating with Operation Yewtree due to the involvement of entertainer Jimmy Savile.

Sky News have reported that the scope of the investigation includes allegations relating to activities at the Haut de la Garenne children's home, and that Jersey police have confirmed that allegations against the former British prime minister Edward Heath feature as part of the investigation.

On 25 September 2015, the States of Jersey Police said they had identified thirty-two victims and sixty suspects, many now dead; fourteen suspects were prominent figures and sixteen victims said they had been assaulted by Savile. Two suspects had been formally charged.

References 

Child sexual abuse in the United Kingdom
Edward Heath
History of Jersey
Jimmy Savile
Operation Yewtree
Police operations in the United Kingdom
Sex crimes in the United Kingdom